Early dukes of Lithuania (including Samogitia) reigned before Lithuanians were unified by Mindaugas into a state, the Grand Duchy of Lithuania. While the Palemonids legend provides genealogy from the 10th century, only few dukes were mentioned by contemporary historical sources. All of them were mentioned in written sources the 13th century. Data about them is extremely scarce and is usually limited to few brief sentences. The primary sources are the Chronicle of Henry of Livonia and Hypatian Codex.

Rulers recorded in historical sources

Žvelgaitis (Svelgates) – earliest known duke. In 1205, he attacked Riga and was killed in the battle, led by ruler of Semigallia, Vester.
Daugirutis (Dangerutis, Dangeruthe) – Livonians imprisoned this Lithuanian duke in 1213, where he killed himself.
Stekšys (Stakys, Steksė) – another powerful duke, killed in 1214 near Lielvārde.
Father of Mindaugas – several sources mention that he was a powerful duke, but do not give his name. 16th century genealogies gave him the name of Ryngold or Ringaudas.
 The following Lithuanian dukes signed a peace treaty with the rulers of Galicia–Volhynia in 1219:
Duke elders
Živinbudas (presumably the eldest duke)
Daujotas
Dausprungas
Mindaugas (brother of Dausprungas)
Vilikaila or Viligaila (brother of Daujotas)
Rulers of Samogitia
Erdvilas
Vykintas
Ruškaičiai family
Kintibutas
Vembutas
Butautas
Vyžeitis
Velžys (son of Vyžeitis)
Kitenis
Plikienė (wife of Plikys, probably a widow)
Bulionys family (three brothers, all of them killed by Mindaugas)
Vismantas (his wife was taken by Mindaugas for himself)
Gedvilas
Sprudeikis
Rulers of the duchy of Deltuva
Juodikis
Buteikis
Bikšys
Ligeikis

Of the dukes who signed the peace treaty, only four are mentioned in other written sources: Mindaugas, who went on to become the Grand Duke of Lithuania and was crowned as King of Lithuania in 1253, Vykintas, leader of anti-Mindaugas coalition during the civil war in 1248–1251, Bikšys and Ligeikis, both identified as Mindaugas relatives and nobles, mentioned in a document, dated 1260 and sometimes considered a forgery.

See also
Palemonids – a list of early mythological rulers of Lithuania
List of Lithuanian rulers
List of Lithuanian monarchs

References

External links

 
Dukes
Lithuania (early)
Lith